A sexual minority is a group whose sexual identity, orientation or practices differ from the majority of the surrounding society. Primarily used to refer to lesbian, gay, bisexual, or non-heterosexual individuals, it can also refer to transgender, non-binary (including third gender) or intersex individuals.

Variants include GSM ("Gender and Sexual Minorities"), GSRM ("Gender, Sexual and Romantic Minorities"), and GSD (Gender and Sexual Diversity). They have been considered in academia, but it is SGM ("Sexual and Gender Minority") that has gained the most advancement since 2014. In 2015, the NIH announced the formation of the Sexual and Gender Minority Research Office and numerous professional and academic institutions have adopted this term.

Sexual and gender minority is an umbrella term that encompasses populations included in the acronym "LGBTI" (lesbian, gay, bisexual, transgender and intersex), and those whose sexual orientation or gender identity varies. It includes those who may not self-identify as LGBTI (e.g., queer, questioning, two-spirit, asexual, men who have sex with men, gender variant), or those who have a specific medical condition affecting reproductive development (e.g., individuals with differences or disorders of sex development, who sometimes identify as intersex).

Origins 
The term sexual minority most likely was coined in the late 1960s under the influence of Lars Ullerstam's book The Erotic Minorities: A Swedish View, which is strongly in favor of tolerance and empathy to paraphilias such as paedophilia and uncommon sexualities in which people were labeled "sex criminals". The term was used as analogous to ethnic minority.

Scientists such as Ritch Savin-Williams support using the term in order to accurately describe adolescent youths who may not identify as any common culturally defined sexual identity label (lesbian, gay, bisexual, etc.) but who still have attractions towards those of the same anatomical sex as themselves.

Associated health and social issues

Stress
Social issues may lead to possible health and psychological issues, especially in youth. It has been found that sexual minorities face increased stress due to stigmas. This stigma-related stress creates elevated coping regulation and social and cognitive processes leading to risk for psychopathology.

Risky behavior
The Centers for Disease Control (CDC) published its 2015 study of large cohorts of ninth to twelfth grade students across the U.S. 100 health behaviors were shown to put LGBT students at risk for health consequences. Sexual minority students engage in more risky behaviors when compared with nonsexual minority students. Some students "had no sexual contact [and] were excluded from analyses on sexual behaviors [including] female students who had sexual contact with only females [and] were excluded from analyses on condom use and birth control use..." Also excluded were "male students who had sexual contact with only males [and] were excluded from analyses on birth control use." One small study conducted by American psychologist, Mark L. Hatzenbuehler showed that LGBT adolescents were victimized more often, had higher rates of psychopathology, left home more frequently, used highly addictive substances more frequently, and were more likely to have more multiple sex partners than heterosexual adolescents.

Development
Based on studies of adolescents, it is concluded that sexual minorities are similar to heterosexual adolescents in developmental needs and concerns. However, research has suggested that sexual minority youth (more specifically LGBT youth) are more susceptible to psychological and health issues than heterosexual youth.

Epidemiology
Sexual minorities tend to use alternative and complementary medicine as alternative methods of addressing their health needs more often than heterosexuals. Sexual minority women have a higher incidence of asthma, obesity, arthritis and cardiovascular disease than other groups.

Adolescent sexual minorities report a higher incidence of the following when compared to heterosexual students:
 having feelings of not being safe travelling to and from school or in school
 not going to school because they did not feel safe.
 being forced to do sexual things they did not want to do by someone they were dating or going out with one or more times during the 12 months (touching, kissing, or physically forced to have sexual intercourse)
 having had sexual intercourse
 having sex for the first time before age 13
 having had sex with at least four other people
 not using birth control
 having had experienced sexual violence

When compared to the general population, sexual minorities have a higher risk for self-injury. The treatment of aging sexual minorities seems to be influenced more by ageism. Support for aging sexual minorities appears to be common.

Discrimination
When gay, lesbian, and bisexual adults reported being discriminated against, 42 percent credited it to their sexual orientation. This discrimination was positively associated with both harmful effects on quality of life and indicators of psychiatric morbidity. Furthermore, those who were bisexuals and homosexuals compared to heterosexuals, tended to report to have one of the five psychiatric disorders examined. It was evident that the discrimination these homosexual individuals experienced had a negative impact leading to psychological changes.

In the media 
Sexual minorities are generally portrayed in the mass media as being ignored, trivialized, or condemned. The term symbolic annihilation accounts for their lack of characterization due to not fitting into the white, heterosexual, vanilla type lifestyle. It has been suggested that online media has developed into a space in which sexual minorities may use "social artillery". This description centers on how social networking and connections to oppose instances of homophobia. Still, some individuals have made their way into the media through television and music. TV shows such as The Ellen DeGeneres Show and Modern Family star individuals who are open about their non-heterosexual lifestyles. In music, people like Sam Smith and Sia have created songs that express their emotions and sexuality with a number of followers. While sexual minorities do have a place in the media, it is often critiqued that they are still limited in their representations. In shows, if a character is gay, they are often a shallow character that is only present for comic relief or as a plot twist. Compared to a heteronormative counterpart, the sexual minority is often a mere side-kick. However, since the integration of actors, musicians, and characters of sexual minorities, the idea of non-normativity has become more normalized in society.

Cultural issues
Current and past research has been "skewed toward SM men—and is disproportionately focused on HIV and other sexually transmitted infections." From 1989 to 2011, numerous grants for research were sponsored and funded by the US National Institutes of Health (NIH) but funded research for sexual minorities and health made up 0.1% of all funded studies. Most research has been directed toward gay and bisexual men. Women sexual minority studies accounted for 13.5%.

Sexual minorities in South Africa have sexual-orientation-related health inequities when compared to other countries. One of the higher incidents of sexual violence directed toward women of a sexual minority occurs in South Africa. Women of color who are living in low-income, urban areas notably are targeted. The perpetrators of sexual violence believe that they are "correcting the women" and that their actions will cure them of their homosexuality.

Controversy 

Some LGBT people object to using the term sexual minorities and prefer the term LGBT. Reasons for these objections may vary. For example, some LGBT people feel that the term sexual minority reminds them about experiencing discrimination and about being a minority. They want to be not a distinct minority but an integral and respectable part of the society. Some other LGBT people dislike the term for being too inclusive, including swingers, polyamorists, BDSM people and other perceived "sexual strangers". These LGBT people want to make a larger distance between these sexual practices and bisexuality/homosexuality/transgender to avoid misconception.

Some transgender and transsexual people dislike the term sexual minority for other reasons. They argue that the phenomenon of transsexuality or transgender has nothing to do with sex, sexual practices or sexual orientation, but it relates to the gender, gender dysphoria and gender-variant behavior or feelings. Thus, they feel it is incorrect to classify them as "sexual minority", when, in fact, they are gender-variant minority.

Some conservative groups oppose the use of the term sexual minority for completely different reasons. They think or feel that the term inherently implies some degree of legalisation or protection for those engaged in such sexual practices, much like ethnic minorities are protected from being discriminated or persecuted in modern democratic countries.

Most people dislike the term because it includes minority, and these people argue that not all these categories are really about minorities but about minorized groups.

Others referred to as "sexual minorities" include fetishists and practitioners in of BDSM (bondage, dominance, and submission) ￼, and sadism and masochism. The term may also include asexuals, fictosexuals and people whose choice of partner or partners is atypical, such as swingers, polyamorists or people in other non-monogamous relationships, and those who have partners significantly older or younger than themselves. It may also refer to people who are in a mixed-race relationship.

Usually, the term sexual minority is applied only to groups who practice consensual sex: For example, it would be unusual to refer to rapists as a sexual minority, but the term generally could include someone whose sexuality gave a major, fetishized role to consensual playing out of a rape fantasy. Also, someone who occasionally incorporates of consensual kink or same-sex activity into, heterosexual sex life usually would not be described as a sexual minority.

See also 

 Alt porn
 Ascribed characteristics
 Bisexual community
 Human male sexuality
 Human sexuality
 Minority group
 Queer
 Sexual minorities in Japan
 Sexual minorities in Sri Lanka
 Sexuality and gender identity-based cultures
 Sociosexual orientation
 Tamil sexual minorities

Explanatory notes

References

External links 
 

LGBT
Minorities
Sexuality and society
Social groups